Kripke is a surname. Notable people with the surname include:

 Dorothy K. Kripke (1912–2000), American author of Jewish educational books, and the mother of Saul Kripke
 Eric Kripke (born 1974), American television writer, director, and producer
Madeline Kripke (1943–2020), American book collector 
 Margaret L. Kripke, professor of immunology
 Myer S. Kripke (1914–2014), American rabbi based in Omaha, Nebraska, and the husband of Dorothy K. Kripke
 Saul Kripke (1940–2022), American philosopher and logician

Fictional characters:
 Barry Kripke, a character in the sitcom The Big Bang Theory